Christina Nilsson Ramsøy (born 4 November 1986) is a Norwegian politician for the Centre Party.

She was born in Steinkjer, and finished secondary school there in 2005. The then studied for two years in Trondheim. She was elected to both Steinkjer municipal council and Nord-Trøndelag county council in 2007. She served one year in the municipal council and the whole four-year term in the county council. She was also the leader of the Centre Youth, the youth wing of the Centre Party, from 2007 to 2009, having chaired the county chapter from 2003 to 2007 and been a central board member from 2006 to 2007.

In the 2009 Norwegian parliamentary election she was elected as a deputy representative to the Parliament of Norway from Nord-Trøndelag. As regular representative Lars Peder Brekk was a cabinet member, she was promoted to a full member of Parliament. She was a member of the Standing Committee on Family and Cultural Affairs. This tenure ended in June 2012, when Brekk returned to Parliament.

References

1986 births
Living people
People from Steinkjer
Politicians from Nord-Trøndelag
Centre Party (Norway) politicians
Members of the Storting
Women members of the Storting
21st-century Norwegian politicians
21st-century Norwegian women politicians